City Airline operated the following services in August 2011 at the time it ceased operations the same year. (See City Airline) :

Czech Republic
Prague - Ruzyně Airport
Estonia
Tallinn - Lennart Meri Tallinn Airport
Finland
Helsinki - Helsinki-Vantaa Airport
France
Lyon - Lyon-Saint Exupéry Airport
Nice - Nice Côte d'Azur Airport
Norway
Bergen - Bergen Airport, Flesland
Oslo - Moss Airport, Rygge
Stavanger - Stavanger Airport, Sola
Spain
Barcelona - Barcelona Airport
Málaga - Málaga Airport
Palma de Mallorca - Son Sant Joan Airport [Seasonal]
Sweden
Gothenburg - Göteborg Landvetter Airport (Main hub)
Luleå - Luleå Airport
Östersund - Åre Östersund Airport [Seasonal]
Umeå - Umeå Airport
Visby - Visby Airport [Seasonal]
Switzerland
Zürich - Zurich Airport
United Kingdom
Birmingham - Birmingham Airport
Manchester - Manchester Airport

External links 
City Airline

References 

Lists of airline destinations